Wilhelm Karl Adalbert Erich Detloff Prinz von Preussen (30 January 1922, in Potsdam – 9 April 2007, in Holzminden) was the third son of Prince Oskar of Prussia, and the last surviving grandson of Wilhelm II, the last German Emperor.  He was the thirty-sixth Master of Knights (Herrenmeister) of the Protestant (and largely German) Order of Saint John (Bailiwick of Brandenburg), also known as Der Johanniterorden, as his father's successor and his son's predecessor.

Biography

Wilhelm-Karl was the youngest of Prince Oskar of Prussia and Countess Ina Marie von Bassewitz's four children.  Having been admitted to the Bailiwick of Brandenburg of the Order of Saint John of the Hospital at Jerusalem (known unofficially as the Johanniterorden, the Protestant successor of the mediaeval Knights Hospitaller) in 1944, he later succeeded his father as its head, serving as the thirty-sixth Herrenmeister ("Master of the Knights") of the Order from 1958 until 1999. Wilhelm-Karl worked tirelessly to keep the Order intact during the Cold War and helped to reunite its membership after the fall of East Germany.

Amongst other orders and awards, Wilhelm-Karl received the Grand Merit Cross (with star) of the Order of Merit of the Federal Republic of Germany and the Grand Cross of the Order pro merito Melitensi of the Sovereign Military Order of Malta.

Marriage and issue 
In 1952, Wilhelm-Karl married Armgard Else Helene von Veltheim (17 February 1926 - 1 November 2019), daughter of Friedrich von Veltheim (1881-1955) and his wife, Ottonie von Alvensleben (1883-1960). The couple had two sons and a daughter:
 Donata-Viktoria Prinzessin von Preussen (born 24 December 1952).
 Wilhelm-Karl Prinz von Preussen (born 25 August 1955).
 Oskar Prinz von Preussen (born 6 May 1959); historian, succeeded his father as the Master of the Knights of the Johanniterorden, he married Auguste Zimmermann von Siefart (born 16 May 1962), daughter of 	Ralf Emil Eberhard Jules Henning Zimmermann von Siefart (b. 1925) and Maria Ida Barbara Helene von Frankenberg und Proschlitz (b. 1930). The couple has two sons and a daughter:
 Oskar Prinz von Preussen (born 29 November 1993); engaged to Johanna Jenisch
 Wilhelmine Prinzessin von Preussen (born 7 July 1995)
 Albert Prinz von Preussen (born 13 July 1998)

Published works

  Auftrag des Johanniters. Ansprachen und Aufsätze ("Transactions of the Johanniter Knights:  Talks and Treatises"); 1983.
  Johanniter und der 20. Juli 1944 ("Johanniter Knights and the Plot of July 20, 1944", written with Lieutenant General Bernd, Baron Freytag von Loringhoven); 1989 (second edition).
  Die Soldaten der Wehrmacht ("The Soldiers of the Wehrmacht", written with Karl-Günther von Hase and Hans Poeppel), 1998 (sixth edition, 2000).

Sources
This page is a translation of the article in the German language Wikipedia

Ancestry

References

Wilhelm-Karl
Wilhelm-Karl
Knights Commander of the Order of Merit of the Federal Republic of Germany
Recipients of the Order pro Merito Melitensi
1922 births
2007 deaths